Theingaba (also spelled Thinhkaba) was the first king of Toungoo (Taungoo) from 1358 to 1367. Prior to his independent reign, he was governor of Toungoo for 11 years before successfully breaking away from Pinya in 1358. He spent his last two years (1365–67) resisting attempts by King Thado Minbya of Ava to reclaim Toungoo.

Governor of Toungoo
Of commoner background, Theingaba first rose to prominence during the administration of Gov. Kayin Ba (1325–42). He eventually became chief minister, and ran the day-to-day affairs of the nominal vassal state of Pinya. The powerful minister continued to serve Ba's successor Letya Sekkya but was sidelined in 1344 when Htauk Hlayga seized the governorship by assassinating Sekkya. Hlayga had timed the assassination during the transition of power at Pinya, and the new king Kyawswa I of Pinya (r. 1344–50) allowed Hlayga to keep the office. Although Hlayga had been a longtime minister since the 1310s, he ultimately proved to be an incompetent ruler. About a year and nine months into Hlayga's rule,  January 1347, Theingaba successfully staged a coup, and put Hlayga to death. Like Hlayga before him, he quickly submitted to Pinya, and was allowed to keep the office.

Theingaba remained a nominal vassal of Pinya for the next decade. He pledged allegiance to King Kyawswa II of Pinya (r. 1350–59), who succeeded the Pinya throne in 1350. But the governor increasingly acted like a sovereign ruler. He conducted his own foreign policy by forging alliances with the Kingdom of Ramanya in the south; Lan Na in the east; and Taungdwin, also a vassal state of Pinya, in the west. An experienced administrator, he kept the region peaceful and prosperous. Toungoo continued to grow in size, attracting migrants from Upper Burma. Immigration from Central Burma to his geographically isolated region accelerated, starting in 1356–57 when the powerful Shan state of Mong Mao (Maw) began raiding the northernmost Central Burmese state of Sagaing.

Ruler of Toungoo

Independence from Pinya
His break with Pinya came shortly after. In 1357/58, Kyawswa II agreed to an alliance with Sagaing to defend against the raids. Theingaba decided not to support Pinya's war effort. The vassal ruler not only refused to provide his share of manpower to Pinya, as vassals were required to do, but also decided to go on the offensive. As the Maw Shans began their raid of Sagaing in late 1358, he raided the five key irrigated zones south of Pinya, up to Yamethin, 200 km north of Toungoo. Having expanded Toungoo's borders to present-day Naypyidaw, the commoner proclaimed himself king. It was a bold proclamation. His predecessors had always stopped short of complete independence, even if they ruled like sovereigns.

Pinya could not respond. Kyawswa II died in March 1359 during the latest raid, and the new king Narathu ultimately decided against a two-front war, and left Toungoo alone. Likewise, Theingaba also left Pinya alone as Narathu struggled to deal with the Maw Shan raids in the following years. In contrast, Toungoo's position became stronger by the day as Toungoo, along with Prome, continued receiving a large number of refugees fleeing the raids. In mid-1364, Theingaba's Toungoo was one of the stronger former vassal states left standing when the Maw Shans sacked both Sagaing and Pinya cities, and left Central Burma in ruins in their wake. But he watched with alarm as a young Sagaing prince named Thado Minbya emerged to reunify the core regions of Central Burma by September 1364. Thado Minbya founded the city of Ava in February 1365, and claimed all the former lands of Sagaing and Pinya Kingdoms.

War with Ava
In July 1365, Thado Minbya began his drive to reclaim the southern vassals of Pinya, starting with Pagan (Bagan) and Sagu. Theingaba could not allow Thado Minbya to acquire the Sagu−Minbu granary since it would give Thado Minbya all three key granaries of Central Burma. Realizing that it would be a matter of time before Ava turned to Toungoo, Theingaba decided to get involved. While Ava forces laid siege to Sagu, Theingaba sent an army led by Baya Kyawthu of Nganwegon to raid the Kyaukse district, the home region of Ava. The raid forced Thado Minbya to rush back but it also put Toungoo on the top of the young king's agenda.

Ava forces invaded Toungoo territory in 1365–66. Toungoo forces made a valiant stand at Nganwegon but after months of heavy fighting, had to retreat in 1366. Ava now controlled the five irrigated zones of the northern Sittaung valley. Theingaba now hunkered down. He did not send any aid to Taungdwin when Ava attacked the state immediately west of Toungoo in 1366–67. At any rate, he was not to see Ava attacks on Toungoo as he died on 29 March 1367. His estranged son Pyanchi succeeded him, and submitted to Ava. Theingaba was the first Toungoo ruler to claim himself king, and successfully stayed independent.

Notes

References

Bibliography
 
 
 
 
 
 

Pinya dynasty
1367 deaths